Wouter Lambertus Martinus Henricus Poels (born 1 October 1987) is a Dutch professional road bicycle racer, who rides for UCI WorldTeam .

Career
Poels was born in Venray. He almost lost a kidney after a massive crash on the sixth stage of the 2012 Tour de France.

After competing with the  squad since 2009, Poels moved to the  squad for the 2014 season.

Team Sky (2015–19)
In September 2014,  announced that Poels would join them from 1 January 2015. His first win for the team came in the 2015 Tirreno–Adriatico, where he led the team following the withdrawal of Chris Froome. Poels won stage 4 into Castelraimondo with an attack on the final climb and a solo descent to the finish line. He moved into the lead of the race and went on to finish seventh in the overall standings. He later finished second overall at the Tour of Britain, winning the toughest mountain stage with an uphill finish on Hartside Fell.

In 2016, Poels won his first one-day race after sprinting to victory from a four-man group in Liège–Bastogne–Liège. It was the first monument for Team Sky and for Poels himself.

Bahrain–McLaren

Major results

2007
 10th Overall Vuelta a Extremadura
1st Mountains classification
2008
 1st  Overall Vuelta Ciclista a León
 3rd Overall Volta a Lleida
 3rd Rund um Düren
 9th Overall Circuit des Ardennes
2010
 1st Stage 4 Tour of Britain
 2nd Overall Tour de l'Ain
1st Stage 4
 8th Overall Tour du Poitou-Charentes
 9th Eschborn–Frankfurt City Loop
2011
 1st Stage 15 Vuelta a España
 2nd Overall Tour de l'Ain
1st Stage 3
 3rd Overall Tour Méditerranéen
1st  Young rider classification
 3rd Overall Vuelta a Murcia
 4th Overall Tour de Pologne
2012
 2nd Overall Tour de Luxembourg
1st  Young rider classification
1st Stage 3
 3rd Overall Vuelta a Murcia
 8th Overall Tirreno–Adriatico
1st  Young rider classification
2013
 7th Amstel Curaçao Race
 8th Overall Tour de l'Ain
1st Stage 4
 9th Overall Tour of the Basque Country
 10th Overall Tirreno–Adriatico
2014
 1st Stage 1 (TTT) Tirreno–Adriatico
 9th Strade Bianche
 10th Overall Tour of the Basque Country
1st Stage 4
2015
 2nd Overall Tour of Britain
1st Stage 5
 3rd Overall Abu Dhabi Tour
 5th Milano–Torino
 7th Overall Tirreno–Adriatico
1st Stage 4
 8th Overall Tour du Poitou-Charentes
 8th GP Ouest–France
2016
 1st  Overall Volta a la Comunitat Valenciana
1st  Points classification
1st  Mountains classification
1st Stages 1 (ITT) & 4
 1st Liège–Bastogne–Liège
 1st Stage 5 Volta a Catalunya
 1st Stage 6 Tour of Britain
 4th La Flèche Wallonne
 7th Overall Vuelta a Andalucía
2017
 3rd Overall Tour de Pologne
1st Stage 7
 4th Overall Volta a la Comunitat Valenciana
 4th Overall Vuelta a Andalucía
 6th Overall Vuelta a España
 6th Milano–Torino
 7th Overall Tour of Guangxi
2018
 1st Stage 4 (ITT) Paris–Nice
 2nd Overall Vuelta a Andalucía
1st  Points classification
1st Stage 2
 2nd Overall Tour of Britain
1st Stage 6
2019
 3rd Overall Tour Down Under
 3rd Overall Volta ao Algarve
 4th Overall Critérium du Dauphiné
1st Stage 7
 7th Overall Tirreno–Adriatico
 10th Liège–Bastogne–Liège
2020
 6th Overall Vuelta a España
 6th Overall Volta a la Comunitat Valenciana
  Combativity award Stage 5 Tour de France
2021
 4th Overall Tour de la Provence
 Tour de France
Held  after Stages 8 & 15–17
 Combativity award Stage 8
2022
 1st  Overall Vuelta a Andalucía
1st Stage 4
2023
 6th Overall UAE Tour

General classification results timeline

References

External links

1987 births
Living people
Dutch male cyclists
People from Venray
UCI Road World Championships cyclists for the Netherlands
Cyclists from Limburg (Netherlands)
Cyclists at the 2016 Summer Olympics
Olympic cyclists of the Netherlands